Röcken is a village and former municipality in the Burgenlandkreis district, in Saxony-Anhalt, Germany. Since 1 July 2009, it has been part of the town of Lützen.

In 1844 philosopher Friedrich Nietzsche was born in the village, where his father was the pastor. The house where he was born is still standing today. Nietzsche is also buried in the town.

In 2006 the Mitteldeutsche Braunkohlengesellschaft mining company disclosed plans to demolish the village to mine for coal, but their plan met with opposition from the "Coalition for Action" with the motto "future instead of lignite". In a public hearing, 64% of the residents voted against drilling on community-owned land. In April 2008, the plans were officially dropped.

Historical Population 
from 1995 as of 31 December:

* 3 October

Notable People 
Friedrich Nietzsche

External links
Nietzsche birthplace website 

Former municipalities in Saxony-Anhalt
Lützen